Carola Helbing-Erben is a German artist. She has worked primarily in textiles and in the creation of tapestries, and also as a mosaic artist and painter.

Biography

Helbing-Erben was born in 1952 in Halle (Saale) in East Germany. She attended university in Halle where she earned her Master of Education degree and then continued her study in the University for Art and Design in Burg Giebichenstein in Halle. Helbing-Erben was commissioned by Sparkasse Bernburg to research and create artworks for an exhibition.

Helbing-Erben received a commission from the city of Bremen in 2011 to design a large public artwork; a mosaic installation on a wall seventy-five feet long. She oversaw the installation of the mosaic pieces placed by the children of the neighborhood in which the artwork was made.

Some of Helbing-Erben's works are on permanent display in the Academy of Textile Art within Giebichenstein Castle.

Before the fall of the Berlin Wall, Helbing-Erben authored the book Tageworte im Buch der Gedanken (Reflections on Daily Life). A small book of thoughts, quotes, poetry and reflections on time, culture and life. It was published in 1992 by Frieling-Verlag Berlin.

Weblinks 
Carola Helbing-Erben in Werkdatenbank Bildende Kunst Sachsen-Anhalt

References

1952 births
Living people
People from Halle (Saale)
German women artists
Tapestry artists
German weavers
Women textile artists